Ewing, as a given name, may refer to:

Ewing Y. Freeland (1887–1953), American football and baseball player and college coach of football, basketball and baseball
Ewing Galloway (1881–1953), American journalist and photography agency owner
Ewing Kauffman (1916–1993), American pharmaceutical entrepreneur, philanthropist and Major League Baseball team owner
Ewing Mitchell (1910–1988), American actor
Ewing Young (1799–1841), American fur trapper and trader

See also
R. Ewing Thomason (1879–1973), American politician